Singapore competed in the 2008 Summer Olympics held in Beijing, People's Republic of China from 8 to 24 August 2008.

The following athletes have qualified for the 2008 Summer Olympics, although the final selection of names for some events may change are dependent on the relevant sports bodies, and all athletes require approval from the Singapore National Olympic Council.

On 17 August 2008, Singapore won its first Olympic medal as an independent nation in the women's table tennis team event, 48 years after its first medal (then as a British colony) – also a silver – by Tan Howe Liang in the 1960 Summer Olympics.

Medalists

Athletics

Men

Women

Key
Note–Ranks given for track events are within the athlete's heat only
Q = Qualified for the next round
q = Qualified for the next round as a fastest loser or, in field events, by position without achieving the qualifying target
NR = National record
N/A = Round not applicable for the event
Bye = Athlete not required to compete in round

Badminton

Sailing

Singapore had qualified the following boats for these Games.

Men

Women

M = Medal race; EL = Eliminated – did not advance into the medal race; CAN = Race cancelled

Shooting

Men

Swimming

Men

Women

Table tennis

Singles

Team

See also
 Singapore at the 2008 Summer Paralympics

References

External links

Team Singapore Beijing 2008 Olympics Microsite
SSC Team Singapore Beijing 2008 Olympics

Nations at the 2008 Summer Olympics
2008
Summer Olympics